The Green Turtle is a superhero originally published by Rural Home Publications. He first appeared in Blazing Comics (1944), and was created by Chinese-American cartoonist Chu F. Hing. While the original run of the character lasted only five issues, the Green Turtle is notable for three factors. First, during WWII, the stories represented the Chinese in U.S. popular media as heroic partners fighting the Axis. One issue begins with the banner 美國及中華民國 (the United States united with the Chinese Republic), and features a U.S. general joining Chinese guerrillas in battle. During the war, U.S. depictions of the Pacific theatre were typically racialized; the "Yellow Peril" stereotypes applied to the Japanese were originally anti-Chinese and portrayed Asians as racial enemies of Western civilization. Second, the character is often identified as the first Asian-American comic book hero. These factors inspired a contemporary graphic novel on the Green Turtle, Shadow Hero, by Gene Luen Yang, whose American Born Chinese was the first work in a comics format to be nominated for the National Book Award.

Character history
The Green Turtle aided the Chinese in guerrilla warfare against the Japanese invaders in World War II. He wore a green cowl and a cloak with a turtle-shell design. Most origin stories around the comic say that Hing initially wanted to make him an overtly Chinese hero, but his publisher would not allow this, believing there would not be a sufficient market for an Asian superhero, so Hing never drew the character without his mask. He had a sidekick, Burma Boy, a young beggar whom the Green Turtle rescued from execution by the Japanese army. He also had a manservant, Wun Too.

The Green Turtle's secret identity was never revealed, and readers never saw the character's face without a mask, until a reboot presented Hank Chu's face, identity, and origin story.

Powers and abilities
The Green Turtle as originally written has no special powers but is a skilled fighter and flies a high-tech Turtle Plane. He wears a large, flowing cape with a green turtle emblem, and is occasionally depicted with a huge, shadowy, black turtle silhouette rearing behind him. Though the significance of this is never established in the original series, it could be a visual reference to the Black Tortoise of Chinese mythology.

Reboot
In 2014, Gene Luen Yang and Sonny Liew created a six-issue miniseries The Shadow Hero to revive the Green Turtle, with a retcon explaining the turtle silhouette as a spirit who keeps the Green Turtle from getting shot. A trade paperback collecting all six issues was published by First Second Books in 2014.

See also
Secret Identities: The Asian American Superhero Anthology

References

External links
Comic Vine: The Green Turtle
Digital Comic Museum - Blazing Comics collection

Comics characters introduced in 1944
Golden Age superheroes
Chinese superheroes